This is a list of aircraft produced by Tupolev, a Russian aircraft manufacturer.

Tupolev aircraft

Early aircraft
ANT-1: The first aircraft by A.N.T. and the first Soviet-built aircraft. Mixed materials design. The work started in 1921. Assembly began in 1922. First flight took place in 1923. The tests were cancelled due to engine malfunction.
ANT-2: Two passenger aircraft. The first Soviet all-metal aircraft, 1924.
ANT-3/R-3/PS-3: All-metal two-seats recce biplane, 1925. About 100 were built.
ANT-4/TB-1: All-metal twin-engined (M-17B) monoplane heavy bomber, 1925. There were 212 aircraft built. There was a G-1 cargo version.
ANT-5/I-4: Prototype of I-4 fighter. The first aircraft designed by Pavel Sukhoi, 1927. 369 were built. I-4 was in service in 1928–1933.
ANT-6/TB-3: Four-engine development of TB-1, 1930. There was a G-2 cargo version.
ANT-7/R-6/KR-6/MR-6: Development of TB-1 as reconnaissance (R-6), "cruiser" (escort fighter, KR-6), and maritime patrol/torpedo bomber (MR-6), 1931.
ANT-8/MDR-2: Maritime long-range recce flying boat, 1931.
ANT-9/PS-9: Three-engined passenger airliner, 1929.
ANT-10/R-7: Reconnaissance/light bomber aircraft prototype, 1930.
ANT-11/MTBT: Twin-hulled flying boat project, 1929.
ANT-12/I-5: Biplane fighter prototype, 1930. Later built as Polikarpov I-5.
ANT-13/I-8: Fighter/interceptor prototype, developed from ANT-12, 1930.
ANT-14 Pravda: Large five-engined propaganda monoplane developed from the ANT-9, 1931.
ANT-15/DI-3: Two-seat fighter project, 1930.
ANT-16/TB-4: Six-engine version of TB-3, predecessor of ANT-20, 1933.
ANT-17/TShB: Prototype ground attack aircraft, 1930.
ANT-18/TSh-2: Twin-engine biplane ground attack aircraft, development of ANT-7, 1930.
ANT-19: Projected airliner based on the TB-1, 1929.
ANT-20 Maxim Gorky: Eight-engine huge cargo/propaganda aircraft, 1934.
ANT-21/MI-3: Multiseat fighter. Development of R-6, 1933.
ANT-22/MK-1: Armoured six-engine recce flying boat prototype, development of ANT-11, 1934.
ANT-23/I-12: Experimental twin-engined fighter equipped with two recoilless 75mm cannons, 1931.
ANT-24/TB-4: Four-engined heavy bomber prototype developed from ANT-16, precursor of ANT-26, 1931.
ANT-25: Single-engine monoplane long-range bomber. Designed by Pavel Sukhoi. ANT-25RD (RD for "Rekord Dalnosty", i.e. "Range Record") was used in a record flight from Moscow to San Jacinto, California, USA over the North Pole—10,148 km, 1933 (one was built in 1989).
ANT-26/TB-6: 12-engined heavy-bomber aircraft project, 1932.
ANT-27/MDR-4/MTB-1: Patrol flying-boat for the Soviet Navy, 1934.
ANT-28: Cargo version of TB-6.
ANT-29/DIP-1: Twin-engined fighter. Development of ANT-21, 1935.
ANT-29 (II): Passenger version of MTB-1.
ANT-30/SK-1: Twin-engine escort fighter/high-speed bomber aircraft, developed from the R-6 and MI-3, 1933.
ANT-31/I-14: All metal monoplane fighter, 1933.
ANT-33: High-wing airliner project, 1932.
ANT-34/MI-4: Multi-seat fighter project.
ANT-35/PS-35: Twin-engined passenger airliner developed from the SB, 1936.
ANT-36/DB-1: Long-range bomber developed from the ANT-25, 1936.
ANT-37/DB-2: Long-range bomber based on the DB-1, 1935.
ANT-38/VSB-1: High-altitude high-speed bomber project, prototype of SB.
ANT-39: Prototype for SB.
ANT-40/SB/PS-40/PS-41: Medium bomber, also erroneously known as SB-2, 1934.
ANT-41/T-1/LK-1: Twin-engine high speed multirole aircraft, 1934.
ANT-42/TB-7: Four-engined heavy bomber prototype, 1936. Later built as Petlyakov Pe-8.
ANT-43: Seven-seat army liaison aircraft/airliner project, 1936.
ANT-44/MTB-2 Chaika: Heavy-bomber flying-boat, 1937.
ANT-45/DIP: Two-seat cannon armed fighter project, 1936.
ANT-46/DI-8: Three-seat fighter prototype, developed from the SB, 1935.
ANT-47/I-20: Fighter project.
ANT-48/SS: High speed sport aircraft project developed from the SB, 1935.
ANT-49: Reconnaissance aircraft project, developed from the SB.
ANT-50: Proposed twin-engined high-speed airliner developed from the ANT-43, 1937.
ANT-51/SZ: Short-range bomber prototype, 1937. Later built as Sukhoi Su-2.
ANT-52:
ANT-53: Proposed four-engined airliner based on the TB-7, 1936. The design was similar to the Boeing 307.
ANT-54:
ANT-55:
ANT-56/SRB: High-speed reconnaissance/bomber project.
ANT-57/PB: High-altitude heavy dive bomber project, 1939.
ANT-58: First prototype of the Tu-2, 1941.
ANT-59: Second prototype of the Tu-2, 1941.
ANT-60: Third prototype of the Tu-2.
ANT-64: Long-range four-engine bomber project, prototype of Tu-4.
ANT-66: 52-seat airliner variant of ANT-64.
Tu-2 "Bat": 3-seat medium bomber, 1941.
Tu-4 "Bull": copied from several seized Boeing B-29 Superfortress. Initial name is B-4 (A.N.T. did not want to give his name to an aircraft designed outside his bureau), 1947.

Experimental aircraft
Tu-1 (ANT-63): prototype night-fighter variant of the Tu-2, 1946
Tu-6: prototype reconnaissance variant of the Tu-2, 1946
Tu-8 (ANT-69): prototype long-range bomber variant of the Tu-2, 1947
Tu-10 "Frosty" (ANT-68): prototype high-speed bomber, developed from the Tu-2, 1943
Tu-12 (also known as Tu-77): medium jet bomber prototype, developed from the Tu-2, 1947
Tu-18 (also known as Tu-72): jet-powered version of the Tu-8, 1947
Tu-20 (also known as Tu-73): jet-powered short-range bomber project, 1947
Tu-20 (II) twin-engined turboprop business aircraft
Tu-22: high-altitude reconnaissance aircraft developed from the Tu-2, 1947
Tu-24: high-altitude bomber project developed from the Tu-2, 1946
Tu-26: original designation of Tu-22M
Tu-28 (also known as Tu-76): bomber project, 1947
Tu-30: four-engined bomber project, 1947
Tu-54: prototype agricultural aircraft, 1992
Tu-64: light multipurpose aircraft project
Tu-70 "Cart": prototype airliner variant of the Tu-4, 1946
Tu-71: prototype short-range bomber developed from the Tu-2, 1946
Tu-72: medium bomber project, 1940s
Tu-73: three-engined development of the Tu-18, 1947
Tu-74 (also known as Tu-73R): proposed high-altitude reconnaissance aircraft developed from the Tu-73
Tu-75: prototype cargo/transport variant of the Tu-4, 1950
Tu-76 (I): radial/jet engined torpedo bomber project developed from the Tu-74, 1946
Tu-76 (II): twin-engined medium bomber project, 1947
Tu-76 (III) (also known as Tu-4D): military transport variant of the Tu-4 
Tu-78: reconnaissance version of Tu-73, 1948
Tu-79 (I): as Tu-4 but powered by M-49TK engines 
Tu-79 (II): as Tu-78 but powered by Soviet engines, 1949; previously known as Tu-73R
Tu-80: prototype long-range bomber variant of the Tu-4, predecessor of Tu-85, 1949
Tu-81 (I): twin-engined medium bomber project developed from the Tu-73, 1949
Tu-81 (II): initial prototype of the Tu-14
Tu-82 "Butcher" (also known as Tu-22): experimental swept-wing jet bomber, 1949
Tu-83: bomber project developed from the Tu-82, 1949
Tu-84: prototype reconnaissance aircraft, 1948
Tu-85 "Barge": prototype long-range heavy bomber variant of the Tu-4, 1951
Tu-86: long-range jet bomber project, 1949
Tu-87: Tu-86 converted into an engine test bed, 1951
Tu-88: initial prototype of the Tu-16, 1952
Tu-89 (also known as Tu-14R): prototype reconnaissance variant of the Tu-14, 1951
Tu-90: prototype turboprop-powered variant of the Tu-16, 1954
Tu-91 "Boot": prototype naval attack aircraft, 1954
Tu-92: initial prototype of the Tu-16R, 1955
Tu-93: proposed version of Tu-14T powered by VK-5 or VK-7 engines, 1952
Tu-94: prototype turboprop-powered variant of the Tu-4, 1950
Tu-95LAL: prototype nuclear-powered aircraft based on the Tu-95M, 1961
Tu-96: prototype long-range intercontinental high-altitude strategic bomber variant of the Tu-95, 1956
Tu-97: long-range bomber project developed from the Tu-16
Tu-98 "Backfin" (also known as Tu-24): prototype swept-wing jet bomber, 1956
Tu-99: prototype turbojet version of the Tu-96
Tu-100: proposed parasite fighter, 1953
Tu-101: assault transport project, 1952
Tu-102: 40-seat turboprop airliner project based on the Tu-101, 1952
Tu-103: supersonic bomber developed from the Tu-97
Tu-105: initial prototype of the Tu-22, 1954
Tu-106: a re-engined Tu-22, 1954
Tu-107: prototype military transport variant of the Tu-104, 1958
Tu-108: proposed long-range bomber based on Tu-22, 1952
Tu-109: long-range supersonic bomber project
Tu-110 "Cooker": prototype long-range airliner developed from the Tu-104, 1957
Tu-111: twin-engine, 24-seat turboprop airliner project, 1954
Tu-112: proposed supersonic tactical bomber, 1955
Tu-114: prototype airliner variant of the Tu-95, entered production
Tu-115 (also known as Tu-114VTA): proposed military transport variant of the Tu-114; cancelled in favor of Antonov An-22
Tu-117: proposed military transport version of the Tu-110
Tu-118: proposed four-engine turboprop freighter version of Tu-104
Tu-119: prototype nuclear and kerosene powered version of the Tu-95LAL
Tu-120: proposed nuclear-powered supersonic bomber
Tu-122: supersonic bomber project based on Tu-98, 1957
Tu-124: low-altitude bomber project, 1957
Tu-125: proposed medium-range supersonic bomber, 1958
Tu-127 (I): proposed supersonic tactical bomber developed from the Tu-98, 1958
Tu-127 (II): proposed military cargo version of Tu-124
Tu-129: supersonic bomber project developed from the Tu-127, 1959
Tu-130: short-range twin turboprop airliner, 1990s
Tu-130 (II): twin-boom cryogenic aircraft project
Tu-132: proposed low-altitude transonic bomber, 1958
Tu-134: SST project developed from the Tu-106, 1960
Tu-135 (I): supersonic strategic bomber project derived from the Tu-95, 1958
Tu-135 (II): supersonic interdiction bomber, 1960
Tu-136 Zvezda: proposed spaceplane
Tu-136 (II): VTOL fighter project, 1963
Tu-136 (III): LNG development of Tu-130, 1990s
Tu-136 (IV): cryogenic LNG-powered feederliner project, 1998
Tu-137: supersonic strategic bomber project
Tu-138: proposed long-range supersonic interceptor of the Tu-28
Tu-139: hypersonic aircraft project (similar to the X-15)
Tu-148: proposed long-range patrol interceptor of the Tu-28
Tu-155: a Tu-154 converted into a testbed for alternative fuels, 1988
Tu-156 (I): turbojet-powered version of Tu-126, 1970
Tu-156 (II): a re-engined Tu-155, late 1980s
Tu-161: strategic bomber project developed from the Tu-160
Tu-164 (I): projected version of Tu-134 with new fuselage, 1967
Tu-164 (II): initial designation of the Tu-154M, 1980
Tu-170: conventional version of Tu-160
Tu-174: proposed lengthened variant of the Tu-154
Tu-184 (I): twin-engine short-haul airliner concept, early 1970s
Tu-184 (II): three-engine medium-haul airliner project, late 1970s
Tu-194 (I): proposed shortened variant of the Tu-154, 1973
Tu-194 (II): lengthened version of Tu-184
Tu-202: anti-submarine aircraft project
Tu-206: a Tu-204 converted into a testbed for alternative fuels
Tu-216: a Tu-204 converted into a testbed for cryogenic fuel
Tu-230 (also known as Tu-260): hypersonic attack aircraft project, 1983
Tu-230: twin-engine military cargo transport; cancelled in favor of Ilyushin Il-214
Tu-244: SST concept developed from the Tu-144, 1979
Tu-334: a short haul jet airliner concept, 1999
Tu-360: hypersonic strategic bomber project, 1980s
Tu-444: a supersonic business jet concept, 2003
Tu-504: strategic heavy bomber flying boat project, based on the Tu-85, 1950
Tu-534: proposed airliner based on the Tu-204, 2007
Tu-2000: proposed long-range heavy bomber, 1986

Bombers and other military types

Tu-14 "Bosun" (also known as the Tu-81) torpedo bomber, 1949
Tu-16 "Badger" strategic bomber, 1952
Tu-20/Tu-95 "Bear" long-range strategic bomber and modifications, 1952
Tu-142 "Bear F/Bear J", anti-submarine/reconnaissance
Tu-22 "Blinder" supersonic medium bomber, 1959
Tu-22M/Tu-26 "Backfire" supersonic swing-wing long-range/maritime strike bomber, 1969
Tu-126 "Moss" airborne early warning (AEW) and control aircraft variant of the Tu-114
Tu-160 "Blackjack" supersonic swing-wing bomber
  - on TASS Official Infographic

Interceptors

Tu-28/Tu-128 "Fiddler"

Airliners/transport

Tu-104 "Camel" medium-range airliner developed from the Tu-16
Tu-114 Rossiya "Cleat" long-range airliner developed from the Tu-95
Tu-116 two Tu-95 bombers fitted with passenger cabins
Tu-124 "Cookpot" a short-haul jet airliner developed from the Tu-104
Tu-134 "Crusty" a rear-engine evolution of the Tu-124
Tu-144 "Charger" the world's first supersonic airliner; the second one is the more successful Concorde
Tu-154 "Careless" a medium-range narrow-body jet airliner
Tu-204 a medium-range narrow-body jet airliner
Tu-214 Tu-204-200's built at a different factory
Tu-224 Tu-214 powered by two Rolls-Royce RB211 engines
Tu-234 internal designation for the Tu-204-300

Unmanned aircraft
Tu-113 proposed unmanned flying bomb, 1955
Tu-121 unmanned drone prototype, 1959
Tu-123 Yastreb-1, 1961
Tu-130 "KR" projected unmanned three-stage intercontinental boost-glide missile, 1957
Tu-131 unmanned surface-to-air missile interceptor prototype, 1959
Tu-133 intercontinental cruise missile based on the Tu-121, 1957
Tu-137 Sputnik: unmanned spaceplane project developed from the Tu-136 Zvezda
Tu-139 Yastreb-2, reusable version of the Tu-123, 1968
Tu-141 Yastreb-P, prototype manned version of the Tu-123
Tu-141 Strizh
Tu-143 Reis
Tu-243 Reis-D, improved version of the Tu-143
Tu-300 Korshun, modernized version of the Tu-143, 1995
Voron, supersonic reconnaissance drone prototype

Planned aircraft
Frigate Ecojet: wide body civil airliner project; initially known as Tu-304
PAK DA: next generation strategic bomber
Tu-324: a regional airliner concept
Tu-330: medium transport aircraft based on the Tu-204/Tu-214
Tu-338: internal designation for the Tu-330K
Tu-344: a supersonic business jet concept based on the Tu-22M3
Tu-404: a long-range extra large flying-wing airliner concept
Tu-414: a stretched Tu-324

Boats
ANT-1, speedboat, 1922.
ANT-2, the first all-metal boat, 1923.
GANT-3 Pervenets, torpedo boat, 1928.
ANT-4/Sh-4 Tupolev, 1927.
ANT-5/G-5, 1933.

Aerosledge
A-3 Aerosledge

Tupolev
Tupolev